Tropical Cyclone Imogen was a weak but damaging tropical cyclone that affected parts of northern Queensland. The sixth tropical low, and the first cyclone of the 2020–21 Australian region cyclone season, Imogen originated from a tropical low that formed in the western Gulf of Carpentaria.

Imogen caused minimal destruction on the northern part of Queensland as a Category 2 cyclone, causing approximately $10 million in damages.

Meteorological history

The system was assigned the identifier code 05U by the BOM. Environmental conditions were assessed as being favourable for tropical cyclogenesis, characterised by very warm sea surface temperatures of up to 31 °C (88 °F), low to moderate vertical wind shear and an established poleward outflow channels in the upper levels. Flaring convection began to develop around the consolidating low-level circulation centre as the system tracked southeastward over the Gulf of Carpentaria, and at 00:00 UTC on 2 January, the BOM issued a tropical cyclone watch for parts of the northwestern Queensland coast. The tropical low continued to strengthen as convective rainbands began to wrap into the system's centre, with moist northwesterly cross-equatorial flow from over Indonesia feeding the system in the low to mid troposphere. By 18:00 UTC, vertical wind shear values had decreased further as the tropical low moved underneath an upper-level ridge; however, despite the highly favourable environmental conditions, intensification was limited somewhat by the broad and elongated nature of the low-level circulation center. The Joint Typhoon Warning Center (JTWC) issued a tropical cyclone formation alert for the system at 20:00 UTC.

Intensification proceeded as the system re-emerged over the Gulf of Carpentaria a few hours later, with spiral rainbands continuing to develop around the centre of the system and deep convection becoming more concentrated. At 06:00 UTC, the tropical low was upgraded to a Category 1 tropical cyclone by the BOM, and was named Imogen, becoming the first tropical cyclone of the 2020–21 Australian region cyclone season. In combination with the low-level northwesterly flow, an upper-tropospheric trough situated to the south of the system began to gradually accelerate Imogen towards the southeast. Deep convection continued to concentrate over the centre of the cyclone; however, due to the system's proximity to land, limited time was available for further intensification. Tropical Cyclone Imogen made landfall just to the north of Karumba, Queensland, at 11:00 UTC on 3 January. The JTWC reported that maximum one-minute sustained winds had reached  by this time.

Despite the centre of the system tracking over land, Imogen maintained its organisation for several hours, assisted by the flat terrain that had been saturated by heavy rainfall generated by the cyclone.

Imogen later accelerated North-East before finally dissipating on January 6.

Preparations and impact
The BOM maintained cyclone warnings for the inland Gulf Country including Croydon due to Cyclone Imogen.

As Cyclone Imogen blasted portions of north-west Queensland, it left extensive damage behind. It brought extreme torrential rain, massive waves and massive high tides as it made landfall. A house in Queensland shaked nearly 5 hours due to the tropical cyclone. It dumped more than 200 millimetres of rain at many places and left 1400 without power. Normanton Airport recorded 186mm of rain in less than 3 hours. A resident in Karumba described it as if it was an earthquake. Most of the damage was limited to damages from flooding and several uprooted trees. In Victoria, extreme rain fell over Gippsland and flood warnings was in place. The cyclone caused at least $10 million of damages.

See also
Tropical cyclones in 2021
Cyclone Damien
Cyclone Ita

References

External links

Bureau of Meteorology

2021 in Australia
Imogen
Imogen
Category 2 Australian region cyclones